Cicimli or Cimcimli or Dzhidzhimli or Dzhimdzhimly may refer to:
 Cicimli, Barda, Azerbaijan
 Cicimli, Lachin, Azerbaijan